Heart Like a Wheel is a 1983 American biographical drama sports film directed by Jonathan Kaplan and based on the life of drag racing driver Shirley Muldowney. It stars Bonnie Bedelia as Shirley Muldowney and Beau Bridges as drag racing driver Connie Kalitta.

The film garnered two award nominations: Bedelia for a Golden Globe Award for Best Actress - Motion Picture Drama, and William Theiss for an Oscar for Best Costume Design.

Plot
In 1956 Schenectady, New York, waitress Shirley Roque marries auto mechanic Jack Muldowney over the mild objections of her singer father Tex, who wants her to be self-sufficient rather than having to rely on a husband. Jack buys a gas station, Shirley becomes a housewife, and they have a son.

For fun, Jack races his hot rod against others on deserted stretches of road late at night. One time, Shirley talks him into letting her drive. She wins and continues winning. A chance encounter with professional driver "Big Daddy" Don Garlits inspires her to look for sponsorship from one of the major car manufacturers, despite her husband's skepticism. As this is the 1950s, a pretty housewife is not taken seriously, especially since there are no women professional drivers, but when she returns home, Jack tells her that he can build her a dragster.

In 1966, she is ready. She still needs to get three signatures before she can get her National Hot Rod Association (NHRA) license, nearly impossible in the macho racing world. Finally, Garlits (seeing an opportunity to broaden the sport's popularity) signs, followed by funny car driver Connie Kalitta, who has his own reasons; Connie talks a reluctant third driver into going along. In her first attempt to qualify for a race, she sets a track record. Later, during a dinner with their respective spouses, Connie gets her alone, makes a pass at her, and she slaps him in the face.

Shirley becomes successful, racing on weekends, but when Connie decides to move up to Top Fuel dragsters, she wants to buy his funny car and compete year round. This exhausts Jack's tolerance for Shirley's racing activity, as he feels neglected, and they separate.

Connie and Shirley become involved romantically, despite his continual philandering. In a 1973 race, Shirley's funny car is destroyed and she is seriously burned. When Connie is suspended indefinitely by the NHRA for fighting on her behalf, she tells him that she is going to Top Fuel. He becomes her crew chief. She wins her first NHRA national event in 1976, then the World Championship in 1977. Finally, tired of Connie's womanizing, she drops him from her team. Angry, he successfully pursues reinstatement by the NHRA.

Shirley, with little sponsorship and an inexperienced crew, has two lean years, but she rebounds in 1980. She races against Connie in that year's NHRA championship final. She is victorious, and they reconcile. Jack, her ex-husband (who had watched the victory on TV), gives her a private cheer.

Cast
Bonnie Bedelia as Shirley Muldowney
Beau Bridges as Connie Kalitta
Leo Rossi as Jack Muldowney
Hoyt Axton as Tex Roque
Bill McKinney as "Big Daddy" Don Garlits
Anthony Edwards as John Muldowney, Shirley and Jack's son
Tiffany Brissette as Little Shirley
Ellen Geer as Marianne Kalitta, Connie's wife

The film also marked the film debut of character actor Leonard Termo, who had a small role as Good Joe.

Reception
Rolling Stones Michael Sragow gave Heart Like a Wheel a mostly positive review, deeming it "flawed but energetic". He remarked that compared to other film biographies, the storyline and depiction of the core subject matter (drag racing) are lacking in drama and clarity, but in part because of that, are much more true to life. For this reason, he felt that drag racing enthusiasts would get more out of the film than those unfamiliar with the sport. He praised the acting as the movie's strongest point, particularly the performances by Bedelia and Bridges.

Muldowney's reaction
Muldowney would rather have had Jamie Lee Curtis play her; she called Bedelia "a snot", and stated, "When she was promoting the movie on TV shows, she would tell interviewers she didn't even like racing. She got out of  race car like she was getting up from the dinner table." Although Muldowney acted as creative consultant on the production, she has mixed feelings about the film itself, stating, "No, the movie did not capture my life very well at all, but more importantly, I thought the movie was very, very good for the sport."

Accolades
The film was nominated for the American Film Institute's 2008 AFI's 10 Top 10 list in the sports film category.

See also
 List of American films of 1983

References

External links

1980s biographical drama films
1983 films
20th Century Fox films
Aurora Productions films
American biographical drama films
American auto racing films
Drag racing
Sports films based on actual events
Films produced by Charles Roven
Films scored by Laurence Rosenthal
Biographical films about sportspeople
Cultural depictions of racing drivers
Cultural depictions of American women
1983 drama films
Films directed by Jonathan Kaplan
1980s English-language films
1980s American films